Donald X. Vaccarino (born 1969) is an American board and card game designer. He published the card game Dominion in 2009, which won the Spiel des Jahres award along with many others, and has had 15 expansions. Dominion and its expansions have sold more than 2.5 million copies worldwide, as of 2017. His 2012 game Kingdom Builder also won the Spiel des Jahres award.

With Dominion, Vaccarino has been credited with pioneering the genre of deck-building games. Dominion has been studied academically as a test-bed for how evolving game rules can create balanced play.

Vaccarino became self-employed as a game designer in 1994. He lives in upstate New York and is a trained programmer. Before his success as a game designer, Vaccarino was influenced by Magic: The Gathering and was credited with contributing to the game in the Comprehensive Rules of Magic. Vaccarino's games have been published by companies including Rio Grande Games and Queen Games.

Selected works 

Vaccarino's published works include:

See also 
 List of game designers
 List of Game of the Year awards (board games)

References

External links 
 Donald X. Vaccarino on BoardGameGeek
 Donald X. Vaccarino on BoardGameAtlas

American game designers
Living people
1969 births
Board game designers